The Taiwan subtropical evergreen forests is an ecoregion that covers most of the island of Taiwan, with the exception of the southern tip of the island, which constitutes the South Taiwan monsoon rain forests ecoregion. The island's concentrated steep mountains host a range of forest types, from subtropical forests in the lowlands to temperate and alpine or montane forests.

Flora
The coastal plains and lower elevations are covered by evergreen laurel-Castanopsis forests, dominated by Chinese Cryptocarya (Cryptocarya chinensis) and Castanopsis hystrix, with scattered stands of the subtropical pine Pinus massoniana. At higher elevations, Japanese blue oak (Quercus glauca) replaces Cryptocarya and Castanopsis as the dominant tree.

As elevation further increases, the evergreen broadleaf trees are gradually replaced by deciduous broadleaf trees and conifers. Above 3,000 meters, deciduous broadleaf trees like Formosan alder (Alnus formosana) and maple (Acer spp.) mix with Taiwan hemlock (Tsuga chinensis).  At the highest elevations, subalpine forests are dominated by conifers, including Taiwan hemlock (Tsuga chinensis), spruces (Picea spp.), and firs (Abies spp.).

Fauna
Mammals: There are sixty types of species of animal in Taiwan.
Birds: There are over 500 species of birds. The migratory birds in Taiwan are famous all over the world.
Reptiles: There are ninety kinds of reptiles.
Amphibians: There are over thirty species of amphibians.
Fishes: There are around 150 kinds of fishes. This excludes the sea fishes.
Insects: There are 17,600 kinds of insects that have been already recognized and named in Taiwan.
Butterflies: There are 400 kinds of butterflies.

There are some rare animal species in Taiwan that are found no where else or otherwise in less numbers. Of particular note are: the Swinhoe Pheasant and the Mikado Pheasant, which are almost extinct in nearby regions. The Formosan rock macaque, a species of monkey, is found only in Taiwan.

Protected areas
20.34% of the ecoregion is in protected areas. Protected areas include:
 Shei-pa National Park
 Taijiang National Park
 Taroko National Park
 Yangmingshan National Park
 Yushan National Park

See also
 Temperate rainforest

External links

References

Ecoregions of Taiwan
Environment of Taiwan
Forests of Taiwan
Indomalayan ecoregions
Montane forests
Tropical and subtropical moist broadleaf forests